Camp Davies was a U.S. Army and Army of the Republic of Vietnam (ARVN) logistics base located on the Saigon River  east of Saigon in southern Vietnam.

History

The camp consisted of over 140 buildings, cantonment facilities for over 1,000 men, field maintenance and storage facilities and 350m of dockage space for harbor craft.

On 29 April 1970 the camp was transferred to the ARVN 3rd Area Logistics Command which based the Saigon Transportation Terminal Command at the site.

Current use
The base remains in commercial use.

References

Installations of the United States Army in South Vietnam
Installations of the Army of the Republic of Vietnam
Military installations closed in the 1970s